Charles Robinson Best (14 June 1909 – 24 May 1996) was an Australian politician.

He was born in Longford, the son of politician Percy Best. In 1950 he was elected to the Tasmanian House of Assembly as a Liberal member for Wilmot. He held the seat until 1958, when he resigned to run for the Legislative Council seat of Meander as an independent. He won, and held the seat until his defeat in 1971. He died in 1996 in Deloraine.

References

1909 births
1996 deaths
Liberal Party of Australia members of the Parliament of Tasmania
Independent members of the Parliament of Tasmania
Members of the Tasmanian House of Assembly
Members of the Tasmanian Legislative Council
20th-century Australian politicians